This is a list of launches made by the Proton rocket between 1980 and 1989. All launches were conducted from the Baikonur Cosmodrome.

Launches

| colspan="6" |

1980

|-

|-
| colspan="6" |

1981

|-

| colspan="6" |

1982

|-

| colspan="6" |

1983

|-

| colspan="6" |

1984

|-

| colspan="6" |

1985

|-

| colspan="6" |

1986

|-

| colspan="6" |

1987

|-

| colspan="6" |

1988

|-

| colspan="6" |

1989

|-

|}

References

Universal Rocket (rocket family)
Proton1980
Proton launches